Jøssund Church is a parish church of the Church of Norway in Ørland municipality in Trøndelag county, Norway. It is located in the village of Jøssund, which is located on the coast about halfway between the coastal villages of Vallersund and Lysøysundet. It is the church for the Jøssund parish, which is part of the Fosen prosti (deanery) in the Diocese of Nidaros. The white, wooden church was built in a long church style in 1875, using plans by the architect Otinius Forbrægd. The church seats about 350 people.

History
The earliest existing historical records of the church date back to the year 1589, but the church was likely built during the 15th century. Around the year 1660, some new windows were installed in the church. During the 1770s, major repairs to the old church were made. In the 19th century the church was considered too small for the number of people attending it. The debate, however, was not about whether to build a larger church, but rather where to build it. The new church was built there in 1875 and it was consecrated on 27 April 1876 by Bishop Andreas Grimelund. The old church was torn down after the new church was put into use. Nes Church was remodeled in 1950 by the architect John Egil Tverdahl and was re-consecrated on 29 May 1953 by Bishop Arne Fjellbu.

Media gallery

See also
List of churches in Nidaros

References

Ørland
Churches in Trøndelag
Long churches in Norway
Wooden churches in Norway
19th-century Church of Norway church buildings
Churches completed in 1875
15th-century establishments in Norway